Donna is an English-language feminine first name meaning "woman" in modern Italian, and "lady" or "mistress" in classical italian. The original meaning is closer to "lady of the home" and is a title of respect in Italy, equivalent to Don for gentlemen or lord. It is a common given name in the United States, particularly in Chicago, Florida, New York City, and Washington. It is rare as a surname.

People with the given name 
Donna Air (born 1979), English actress
Donna Axum (1942–2018), American beauty pageant winner, author, television executive producer, philanthropist and model
 Donna Baird, American epidemiologist and evolutionary-population biologist
Donna J. Boley (born 1935), American politician
 Donna Brazile, American political activist
 Donna Burke, Australian singer, voice actress and businesswoman
 Donna Cruz, Filipino pop singer
 Donna D'Errico, American actress
 Donna Dixon, American actress
 Donna Douglas, American actress
 Donna Edwards, American politician
 Donna Fargo, American country singer
 Donna M. Felling, American politician
 Donna Feore (born 1963), Canadian choreographer and theatre director
 Donna Gould (born 1966), Australian cyclist
Donna Haraway, American philosopher
Donna Hylton, Jamaican-American kidnapper and murderer
 Donna Karan, American fashion designer
Donna Kimball, American muppeteer
 Donna Leon, American novelist
 Donna Lewis, Welsh singer
 Donna Loren, American singer and actress, the Dr Pepper Girl in the 1960s
 Donna Maguire, Provisional Irish Republican Army member
 Donna Mayhew, American javelin thrower
 Donna McKechnie, American actress
 Donna Mills, American actress who played Abby Cunningham on Knots Landing
 Donna Morrissey, Canadian author
 Donna Murphy, American stage and film actress
 Donna Orender (née Geils; born 1957), American Women's Pro Basketball League All-Star guard and former WNBA president
 Donna Pescow, American actress
 Donna Reed, American actress
 Donna Robertson (born 1969), Scottish judoka and wrester
 Donna Rubin (born 1959), American tennis player
 Donna Scott-Mottley, Jamaican politician
 Donna Shalala, Secretary of Health and Human Services under President Bill Clinton
 Donna Strickland, Canadian physicist and Nobel laureate 2018
 Donna Summer, American singer, notably of disco music
 Donna Tartt, American writer
 Donna Testerman (born 1960), mathematician
 Donna Vekić, Croatian tennis player

Fictional characters
 Donna Bishop, character in Home and Away
 Donna Cabonna, character in That's So Raven
Donna Duck, character in the 1937 Disney short Don Donald
Donna Clark (née Emerson), a character in Halt and Catch Fire
 Donna Freedman, character in Neighbours
 Donna Hayward, character in Twin Peaks
 Donna Henshaw, a character in Two Pints of Lager and a Packet of Crisps
 Donna Logan, character in The Bold and the Beautiful
 Donna Ludlow, character in EastEnders
 Donna Martin, character in Beverly Hills, 90210
 Donna Meagle, main character in Parks and Recreation
 Donna Moss, main character in The West Wing
 Donna Noble, character in Doctor Who
 Donna Paulsen, character in Suits
 Donna Pinciotti, character That 70s Show
 Donna Sheridan in Mamma Mia!
 Donna Troy aka "Wonder Girl", character from DC Comics
 Donna Tubbs, character in The Cleveland Show
 Donna Windsor, character in Emmerdale
 Donna Yates, character in EastEnders

See also

Donka (name)

References

Given names
English feminine given names
Italian feminine given names
Scottish feminine given names
Welsh feminine given names